Douglas Kelly is a Canadian businessman. Kelly is the current president of St. Joseph Communications. Prior to this role, he was the Editor-in-Chief and Publisher of the Canadian National Post newspaper.

References

Living people
Canadian male journalists
National Post editors
Year of birth missing (living people)
Place of birth missing (living people)